Fire of Unknown Origin is the eighth studio album by the American hard rock band Blue Öyster Cult, released on June 22, 1981. It was produced by Martin Birch.

The album, which included the Top 40 hit "Burnin' for You" (#1 on Billboard's Album Rock Tracks chart), represented a resurgence of the group's commercial standing after two albums with disappointing sales. It became the band's highest-charting studio album on the Billboard 200, peaking at number 24. Fire of Unknown Origin would be the final studio LP featuring the band's original lineup; during the subsequent tour, the band fired original drummer Albert Bouchard.

Songs
Several of the songs were intended for the soundtrack of the animated film Heavy Metal, such as "Vengeance (The Pact)," the lyrics of which follow in detail the plot of the "Taarna" segment of the movie. However, only the song "Veteran of the Psychic Wars" (ironically not written for the film), co-written by science fiction author Michael Moorcock, ended up in the film's final version and soundtrack. The title track was used in episode 17 of season 1 of Supernatural entitled "Hell House," written by long-time BÖC fan Trey Callaway.

The album's closing track, "Don't Turn Your Back," marks Allen Lanier's final songwriting contribution to Blue Öyster Cult; it was played live by the group for the first time on June 17, 2016, at a special concert highlighting Lanier's music.

The album's title track, "Fire of Unknown Origin," was originally considered for the band's fourth album, but was cut. The original version of the song is available through the band's 2017 compilation Rarities.

"Joan Crawford" was a moderate success, reaching #49 on the Billboard Mainstream Rock chart. The subject of the song is the actress of the same name, who had died four years before the song's release. A music video was created for the song, which was famously banned by MTV for featuring a sexually suggestive scene.

Track listing

Personnel
Band members
Eric Bloom – vocals, guitar, bass on track 5
Donald 'Buck Dharma' Roeser – lead guitar, vocals, percussion on track 3, bass and sound effects on track 8
Allen Lanier – keyboards
Joe Bouchard – bass, vocals
Albert Bouchard – drums, synthesizer, vocals, mixing (uncredited)

Additional musicians
Karla DeVito – background vocals on track 4
Sandy Jean – background vocals on track 9
Bill Civitella, Tony Cedrone – additional percussion on track 3
Jesse Levy – string arrangements on tracks 3 and 8

Production
Martin Birch – producer, engineer, mixing
Clay Hutchinson – engineer
Paul Stubblebine – mastering
Greg Scott – album artwork

Charts

Album

Singles
Burnin' for You

Joan Crawford

Certifications

References

Blue Öyster Cult albums
1981 albums
Albums produced by Martin Birch
Columbia Records albums